Andri Marteinsson (born 31 January 1965) is an Icelandic former footballer who played as a midfielder. He won 20 caps for the Iceland national football team between 1984 and 1994.

Andri was most recently the manager of 1. deild karla side ÍR, having also previously coached Haukar and Víkingur Reykjavík.

References

Andri Marteinsson international appearances at ksi.is

Marteinsson, Andri
Marteinsson, Andri
Icelandic footballers
Association football defenders
Knattspyrnufélagið Víkingur players
Knattspyrnufélag Reykjavíkur players
Fylkir players
Breiðablik UBK players
Lyn Fotball players
Iceland international footballers
Þór Akureyri players
Icelandic football managers